The Murder (Abolition of Death Penalty) Act 1965 is an Act of the Parliament of the United Kingdom. It abolished the death penalty for murder in Great Britain (the death penalty for murder survived in Northern Ireland until 1973). The act replaced the penalty of death with a mandatory sentence of imprisonment for life.

Provisions
The 1965 act amended the Homicide Act 1957, which had already reduced hangings to only four or fewer per year. 

The 1965 act was introduced to Parliament as a private member's bill by Sydney Silverman MP. The act provides that charges of capital murder at the time it was passed were to be treated as charges of simple murder and all sentences of death were to be commuted to sentences of life imprisonment. The legislation contained a sunset clause, which stated that the act would expire on 31 July 1970 "unless Parliament by affirmative resolutions of both Houses otherwise determines". Resolutions were passed in the Commons and Lords on 16 and 18 December 1969, thereby making the act permanent.

Subsequent events
No executions have occurred in the United Kingdom since the Murder (Abolition of Death Penalty) Act. The last were on 13 August 1964, when Peter Allen and Gwynne Evans were hanged for murdering John Alan West during a theft four months earlier, a death penalty crime under the 1957 act. The 1965 act left four capital offences: high treason, "piracy with violence" (piracy with intent to kill or cause grievous bodily harm), arson in royal dockyards and espionage, as well as other capital offences under military law. 

The 1965 act did not extend to Northern Ireland, where Westminster seldom overrode the criminal law responsibility of the Parliament of Northern Ireland at Stormont. During the Troubles Westminster passed the Northern Ireland Constitution Act 1973, abolishing Stormont, and the Northern Ireland (Emergency Provisions) Act 1973, abolishing the death penalty for murder there. The death penalty was not fully abolished in the United Kingdom until 1998 by the Human Rights Act and the Crime and Disorder Act.

See also
Death penalty
Murder in English law
Capital punishment in the United Kingdom

Notes

Further reading

External links

 Indexes of mentions in Hansard:
 Murder (Abolition of Death Penalty) Bill
 Murder (Abolition of Death Penalty) Act 1965 

English criminal law
United Kingdom Acts of Parliament 1965
Capital punishment in the United Kingdom
Murder in the United Kingdom
Anti–death penalty laws